Emodin (6-methyl-1,3,8-trihydroxyanthraquinone) is a chemical compound, of the anthraquinone family, that can be isolated from rhubarb, buckthorn, and Japanese knotweed (Reynoutria japonica syn. Polygonum cuspidatum). Emodin is particularly abundant in the roots of the Chinese rhubarb (Rheum palmatum), knotweed and knotgrass (Polygonum cuspidatum and multiflorum) as well as Hawaii ‘au‘auko‘i cassia seeds or coffee weed (Semen cassia). It is specifically isolated from Rheum palmatum L. It is also produced by many species of fungi, including members of the genera Aspergillus, Pyrenochaeta, and Pestalotiopsis, inter alia. The common name is derived from Rheum emodi, a taxonomic synonym of Rheum australe, (Himalayan rhubarb) and synonyms include emodol, frangula emodin, rheum emodin, 3-methyl-1,6,8-trihydroxyanthraquinone, Schüttgelb (Schuttgelb), and Persian Berry Lake.

Pharmacology
Emodin is an active component of several plants used in Traditional Chinese Medicine (TCM) such as Rheum palmatum, Polygonum cuspidatum and Polygonum multiflorum. It has various actions including laxative, antibacterial and antiinflammatory effects, and has also been identified as having potential antiviral activity against coronaviruses such as SARS-CoV-2, being one of the major active components of the antiviral TCM formulation Lianhua Qingwen.

A computational study was conducted to investigate the inhibition mechanism on the formation of the Spike-ACE2 protein complex. Specifically, it is seen dose-dependent inhibition in the prevention of infection by the SARS-Cov-1 whose evidence has stimulated further investigations on SARS-Cov-2.

Emodin has been shown to inhibit the ion channel of protein 3a which could play a crucial role in the release of the virus from infected cells.

List of plant species 
The following plant species produce emodin:
 Acalypha australis
 Cassia occidentalis
 Cassia siamea
Frangula alnus
 Glossostemon bruguieri
 Kalimeris indica
 Polygonum hypoleucum
 Reynoutria japonica (syn. Fallopia japonica) (syn. Polygonum cuspidatum)
 Rhamnus alnifolia, the alderleaf buckthorn
 Rhamnus cathartica, the common buckthorn
 Rheum palmatum
 Rumex nepalensis
 Senna obtusifolia (syn. Cassia obtusifolia)
 Thielavia subthermophila
 Ventilago madraspatana

Compendial status 
 British Pharmacopoeia

 List of compounds with carbon number 15

References 

Trihydroxyanthraquinones
Virucides
Resorcinols
3-Hydroxypropenals within hydroxyquinones